Antonio Rodrigo Betancort Barrera (13 March 1937 – 15 March 2015) was a Spanish footballer. He was born in Las Palmas, and played as a goalkeeper for Las Palmas, Real Madrid, and Deportivo La Coruña, and the Spain national team.

Antonio Betancort died on 15 March 2015 in Las Palmas, of undisclosed reasons.

References

External links
 

1937 births
2015 deaths
Spanish footballers
Spain international footballers
1966 FIFA World Cup players
Association football goalkeepers
UD Las Palmas players
Real Madrid CF players
Deportivo de La Coruña players
Footballers from Las Palmas
La Liga players
Segunda División players